Barbro Kvåle  (born 21 February 1992) is a Norwegian cross country skier and ski orienteering competitor.

At the 2011 World Ski Orienteering Championships she won a silver medal in women's relay, along with Stine Olsen Kirkevik and Marte Reenaas on the Norwegian team, while she placed 9th in the long distance, 14th in the middle distance, and 5th in the sprint.

References

External links

 

1992 births
Living people
Norwegian orienteers
Ski-orienteers
20th-century Norwegian women
21st-century Norwegian women